This Is My Time is the third studio album by American singer-songwriter and actress Raven-Symoné, released in the United States on September 21, 2004 by Hollywood Records. The album is her debut with the Disney-owned label and debuted at number 51 on the US Billboard 200, with 19,000 copies sold in its first week. It nevertheless became Raven-Symoné's best-selling solo album, selling 235,000 copies up to February 2, 2007 in the US, according to Nielsen SoundScan.

Release and promotion 
Raven-Symoné released a five-track EP with Hollywood Records on January 1, 2004 prior to the release of This Is My Time, containing "Backflip", "Bump", "Overloved", "What Is Love?", and "Mystify". Released to promote the full-length album, the EP was only available in select stores and is now very rare.

Four songs from the album were incorporated into soundtracks of Walt Disney films: The Lion King 1½ with "Grazing in the Grass"; The Princess Diaries 2: Royal Engagement with the album's title track; Ice Princess with "Bump"; and Go Figure with "Life Is Beautiful".

Critical reception 

Following its release, This Is My Time received generally mixed reviews. Both AllMusic and Vibe gave the album two and a half stars out of five.

Commercial performance 
This Is My Time debuted at number 50 on the US Billboard Top R&B/Hip-Hop Albums chart and at number 51 on the official Billboard 200 of week dated October 9, 2004, with moderately successful first week sales of 19,000 copies (best debut in the chart to date); making it Raven-Symoné's first album to enter the chart in the United States. The set sold 235,000 copies up to February 2, 2007 in the US, according to Nielsen SoundScan.

Track listing 

Notes
"What Is Love?" is a cover originally performed by Play from the album Replay.
"Grazing in the Grass" is a cover of the Billboard Hot 100 number-one single by Hugh Masekela from the album The Promise of a Future.
"Overloved" was later covered by Paula DeAnda on her debut self-titled album.

Tour 
Raven in Concert was the debut concert tour by Raven-Symoné in support of This Is My Time. Primarily visiting North America, the tour played nearly 40 shows at numerous music festivals and state fairs in the United States.

Opening acts
Lil' J (August 6–13, August 16–29, September 8, September 15 and October 7, 2006)
Jump5 (Baton Rouge, Fairlea, Agawam and Allegan)
LaTanya Monroe (Glen Allen)
Lil J Xavier (Arlington)
Everlife (Arlington)
Choo-Choo Soul (Monroe)

Charts

Release history

References 

2004 albums
Albums produced by Matthew Gerrard
Albums produced by Robin Thicke
Albums produced by Scott Storch
Albums produced by Tricky Stewart
Albums produced by Walter Afanasieff
Hollywood Records albums
Raven-Symoné albums